Hopton Fen is a  biological Site of Special Scientific Interest north of Hopton in Suffolk. It is managed by the Suffolk Wildlife Trust.

This reed-dominated fen has diverse flora, including devil's bit scabious, black bog-rush, bogbeana and early marsh orchid. The Trust is improving the site by excavating new pools, and introducing grazing to restore the open landscape.

There is access by a footpath from Hopton.

References

Suffolk Wildlife Trust
Sites of Special Scientific Interest in Suffolk